First Presbyterian Church of Hector is a historic Presbyterian church located at Hector in Schuyler County, New York.  It was built in 1818 and is a large, rectangular Federal era frame building distinguished by a variety of Georgian inspired design and decorative features in the New England tradition of meeting house architecture.  The front facade features a massive, balustraded steeple crowned with a handsome, pyramid-roofed belfry.

It was listed on the National Register of Historic Places in 2001.

References

Churches on the National Register of Historic Places in New York (state)
Presbyterian churches in New York (state)
Federal architecture in New York (state)
Churches completed in 1818
19th-century Presbyterian church buildings in the United States
Churches in Schuyler County, New York
National Register of Historic Places in Schuyler County, New York